Gluconacetobacter johannae is a species of acetic acid bacteria first isolated from rhizospheres and rhizoplanes of coffee plants. Its type strain is CFN-Cf55T (= ATCC 700987T = DSM 13595T).

References

Further reading

External links

LPSN
Type strain of Gluconacetobacter johannae at BacDive -  the Bacterial Diversity Metadatabase

Rhodospirillales
Bacteria described in 2001